Héctor Hernán Caputto Gómez (born 6 October 1974 in San Andrés de Giles), known as Hernán Caputto, is an Argentine-born naturalized Chilean football manager and former footballer who played as a goalkeeper.

Playing career
A product of  Platense, Caputto has never played in Argentine Primera División. In the Chilean Primera División Caputto has played for Unión Española, Palestino, Deportes Puerto Montt, and Provincial Osorno.  In the Chilean Second Division Caputto has played for Magallanes and Unión San Felipe.  In the Argentine Second Division he played for Tigre. In addition, he had a brief step with Indonesian club PSM Makassar in 2004.

Before the 2006 Clausura tournament in Chile, Caputto was signed by Universidad de Chile to replace José Carlo Fernández. Caputto was the backup until January 27, 2008 when, after a year and a half on Universidad de Chile, Caputto finally debuted with 2–1 victory over Deportes Concepción in the 2008 Apertura opener.  Regular first team goalkeeper Miguel Pinto was in Asia with the Chile national team.

Caputto retired from football in 2011.

Managerial career
From 2011 to 2012, Caputto worked as the goalkeeping coach of Chile at youth levels and as the coach of Chile at under-15 level between 2013 and 2015, winning the friendly 2015 Aspire Tri-Series International Tournament in Doha, Qatar. In 2016 he assumed as the coach of Chile U17, getting qualification to two World Cup editions: 2017 and 2019.

After Alfredo Arias was released from Universidad de Chile, in 2019 he assumed as the coach for the first team until November 2020.

Personal life
Caputto naturalized Chilean by residence.

His son, Franco, is a footballer from the Barnechea youth ranks.

Honours

Player
Universidad de Chile
Primera División de Chile (1): 2009 Apertura

Manager
Chile U15
 Aspire Tri-Series International Tournament: 2015

References

External links
 
 
 Hernán Caputto at PlaymakerStats

1974 births
Living people
Argentine sportspeople of Italian descent
Footballers from Buenos Aires
Argentine footballers
Argentine emigrants to Chile
Naturalized citizens of Chile
Chilean footballers
Association football goalkeepers
Club Atlético Platense footballers
Club Atlético Tigre footballers
Provincial Osorno footballers
Unión Española footballers
Deportes Magallanes footballers
Magallanes footballers
Puerto Montt footballers
PSM Makassar players
Club Deportivo Palestino footballers
Unión San Felipe footballers
Universidad de Chile footballers
C.D. Huachipato footballers
Primera Nacional players
Primera B Metropolitana players
Primera B de Chile players
Indonesian Premier League players
Chilean Primera División players
Argentine expatriate sportspeople in Chile
Expatriate footballers in Chile
Argentine expatriate sportspeople in Indonesia
Chilean expatriate sportspeople in Indonesia
Expatriate footballers in Indonesia
Chilean football managers
Universidad de Chile managers
Chilean Primera División managers